The Lone Wolf Returns is a 1923 crime novel by Louis Joseph Vance which was the basis of two movies:

 The Lone Wolf Returns (1926 film), featuring Bert Lytell
 The Lone Wolf Returns (1935 film), starring Melvyn Douglas